Indian Orchard is a neighborhood in the City of Springfield, Massachusetts. Located in the northeast corner of Springfield, next to the Chicopee River, Indian Orchard is the city's fifth largest neighborhood.

History 
Indian Orchard began in the 1840s as an isolated mill town and has preserved its identity over the years, even after becoming more fully encompassed by Springfield. Many of the early mill workers were French-Canadian immigrants.

The First Congregational Church of Indian Orchard, built in 1863, is Springfield's third-oldest church.

Indian Orchard was also home to Chapman Valve Manufacturing Company, which converted uranium rods into slugs to be used as nuclear reactor fuel, for the U.S. Army Corps of Engineers Manhattan Engineer District. The site was remediated in 1995. It is now occupied by a solar energy facility.

Neighborhood 
Because of its origins as a separate town, Indian Orchard contains many streets with names that are identical to entirely different streets in Springfield's Metro Center, having, for example, its own Main Street, differentiated only by the Indian Orchard name and ZIP code.

One of Indian Orchard's former mills is now a large artists' studio space; this has been the catalyst for the neighborhood's growing arts & crafts scene. The Indian Orchard Mills/Dane Gallery hosts an artists' open house twice a year. Hubbard Park is a major source of recreational activities. The Indian Orchard branch of the Springfield Library offers adult and family activities. The neighborhood is also home to Lake Lorraine State Park, a swimming beach formerly home to the public; however, the beach has been closed since budget cuts in 2009. Large employers include Solutia and a US Postal Service bulk mail facility. 

Indian Orchard is home to the Titanic Museum.

References

Neighborhoods in Springfield, Massachusetts